Slepče may refer to:
 Slepče, Demir Hisar, North Macedonia
 Slepče, Dolneni, North Macedonia